The Boil is a prominent snow eminence marked by rock exposures on the northeast side of the Reeves Neve, in Victoria Land. It rises over 2,300 m and stands 4 nautical miles (7 km) east of Shepard Cliff. The descriptive name was apparently applied by the Southern Party of the New Zealand Geological Survey Antarctic Expedition (NZGSAE) during a visit to the feature in December 1962.

Mountains of Victoria Land
Borchgrevink Coast